Harrison Township may refer to:

Arkansas
 Harrison Township, Hot Spring County, Arkansas, in Hot Spring County, Arkansas
 Harrison Township, Union County, Arkansas, in Union County, Arkansas
 Harrison Township, White County, Arkansas, in White County, Arkansas

Illinois
 Harrison Township, Winnebago County, Illinois

Indiana
 Harrison Township, Bartholomew County, Indiana
 Harrison Township, Blackford County, Indiana
 Harrison Township, Boone County, Indiana
 Harrison Township, Cass County, Indiana
 Harrison Township, Clay County, Indiana
 Harrison Township, Daviess County, Indiana
 Harrison Township, Dearborn County, Indiana
 Harrison Township, Delaware County, Indiana
 Harrison Township, Elkhart County, Indiana
 Harrison Township, Fayette County, Indiana
 Harrison Township, Harrison County, Indiana
 Harrison Township, Henry County, Indiana
 Harrison Township, Howard County, Indiana
 Harrison Township, Knox County, Indiana
 Harrison Township, Kosciusko County, Indiana
 Harrison Township, Miami County, Indiana
 Harrison Township, Morgan County, Indiana
 Harrison Township, Owen County, Indiana
 Harrison Township, Pulaski County, Indiana
 Harrison Township, Spencer County, Indiana
 Harrison Township, Union County, Indiana
 Harrison Township, Vigo County, Indiana
 Harrison Township, Wayne County, Indiana
 Harrison Township, Wells County, Indiana

Iowa
 Harrison Township, Adair County, Iowa
 Harrison Township, Benton County, Iowa
 Harrison Township, Boone County, Iowa
 Harrison Township, Harrison County, Iowa
 Harrison Township, Kossuth County, Iowa
 Harrison Township, Lee County, Iowa
 Harrison Township, Mahaska County, Iowa
 Harrison Township, Osceola County, Iowa

Kansas
 Harrison Township, Chautauqua County, Kansas
 Harrison Township, Franklin County, Kansas
 Harrison Township, Greeley County, Kansas
 Harrison Township, Jewell County, Kansas
 Harrison Township, Nemaha County, Kansas, in Nemaha County, Kansas
 Harrison Township, Rice County, Kansas, in Rice County, Kansas
 Harrison Township, Wallace County, Kansas, in Wallace County, Kansas

Michigan
 Harrison Township, Michigan

Minnesota
 Harrison Township, Minnesota

Missouri
 Harrison Township, Daviess County, Missouri
 Harrison Township, Grundy County, Missouri
 Harrison Township, Mercer County, Missouri
 Harrison Township, Moniteau County, Missouri
 Harrison Township, Scotland County, Missouri
 Harrison Township, Vernon County, Missouri

Nebraska
 Harrison Township, Buffalo County, Nebraska
 Harrison Township, Hall County, Nebraska
 Harrison Township, Knox County, Nebraska

New Jersey
 Harrison Township, Gloucester County, New Jersey

North Dakota
 Harrison Township, Ward County, North Dakota, in Ward County, North Dakota

Ohio
 Harrison Township, Carroll County, Ohio
 Harrison Township, Champaign County, Ohio
 Harrison Township, Darke County, Ohio
 Harrison Township, Gallia County, Ohio
 Harrison Township, Hamilton County, Ohio
 Harrison Township, Henry County, Ohio
 Harrison Township, Knox County, Ohio
 Harrison Township, Licking County, Ohio
 Harrison Township, Logan County, Ohio
 Harrison Township, Montgomery County, Ohio
 Harrison Township, Muskingum County, Ohio
 Harrison Township, Paulding County, Ohio
 Harrison Township, Perry County, Ohio
 Harrison Township, Pickaway County, Ohio
 Harrison Township, Preble County, Ohio
 Harrison Township, Ross County, Ohio
 Harrison Township, Scioto County, Ohio
 Harrison Township, Van Wert County, Ohio
 Harrison Township, Vinton County, Ohio

Pennsylvania
 Harrison Township, Allegheny County, Pennsylvania
 Harrison Township, Bedford County, Pennsylvania
 Harrison Township, Potter County, Pennsylvania

South Dakota
 Harrison Township, Spink County, South Dakota, in Spink County, South Dakota

Township name disambiguation pages